Jhuruli is a village in Basirhat II CD Block in Basirhat subdivision of North 24 Parganas district of the Indian state of West Bengal.

Etymology
The name "Jhuruli" is a Bengali word adopted in the 18th century, though the meaning is still unknown.

Geography
Jhuruli is situated in the Ganges Brahmaputra delta of West Bengal. It is about 30 km from the Bangladesh border and 50 km from Kolkata, Capital of the West Bengal. A high tension electricity transmission line of 11 kv from Harishpur, Basirhat has been routed through the village road.

Weather
The weather in Jhuruli is similar to that elsewhere in West Bengal, with a tropical climate, specifically a tropical wet and dry climate(Aw) under the Köppen climate classification, with seven months of dryness and peak of rains in July. Humidity is always higher side but not in winter. The cooler season from December to February is followed by the summer season from March to June. The period from June to about the end of September constitutes the south-west monsoon season, and October and November form the post-monsoon season. Between June and September, the south west monsoon rains lash the village. Pre-monsoon showers are received in May. Occasionally, north-east monsoon showers occur in October and November.

The maximum annual rainfall ever recorded was 1500 mm for every year. The highest rainfall recorded in a single day was 850 mm. The average total annual rainfall is 1500 mm. The average annual temperature is 32 °C, and the average maximum temperature is 35 °C, while the average minimum temperature is 28 °C. In the summer the temperature is up to 35 °C, but in winter it drops to approximately 10 °C. Annual rainfall is about 1 500 mm.

Summer is sticky sweating and boiling at room temperature. Every season is individually realized here.

Groundwater

The groundwater has been affected by arsenic problem in this village but has found harmless water solution for drinking. So the Government of West Bengal spread in several places here for digging the tube oil, and water pump houses.

The North 24 Parganas district has been identified as one of the areas where ground water is affected by arsenic contamination.

Demographics
 Indian census, Jhuruli had a population of 2,967: 1,545 male and 1,422 female. It has an average literacy rate of 75.02%, higher than the national average of 74.04%.

Economy
Many villagers work in the fishery business. Another local business is transportation of fabric, fish, and other products to Kolkata.

Village parts

The village consists of six parts: 
Mazer para(Bengali: মাঝের পাড়া)
Molla para (Bengali:মোল্লা পাড়া) 
Shekh para (Bengali:শোখ পাড়া) 
Purba para (Bengali:পূর্ব পাড়া) 
Dafadar para (Bengali:দফাদার পাড়া)
Kona para. (Bengali:কোনা পাড়া)

These six parts fell into two booths namely,

Booth no-8
Booth no-9

Politics
Jhuruli has some political parties which work under Lok Sabha, Rajya Sabha and Vidhan Sabha. The election commission elected members for villages. Here are some political parties All India Trinamool Congress, Communist Party of India (Marxist), PDCI Party, Indian National Congress. The present village members are Mostafa Dafadar and Khadija Bibi for AITMC in 2018 and Member of Parliament is Idris Ali and MLA is Rafikul Islam.

Political members of 2003-2018

Education
The educational percentage here is about 40% but gradually increasing.

Jhuruli Adarsha Vidyapith and Jhuruli Jr Basic School located in this village are a grade school running up to grade class 10 and a primary school up to grade class 4 respectively

Schools in the village

 Jhuruli Adarsha Vidyapith
Jhuruli Jr Basic School
Jhuruli Uttar para Sid Ami

Rural structure

In Jhuruli all boundaries which bounded the village are seemed to be specific. The area cover mostly with small parts of the village. The edge of the village which also stated round the village is watery called sometime "Jolkor" means water tax and some time Plunge means general use free water. Jolkor is projected with fishery which is the main economic point of the village. The roads about here are narrow,they are seemed as turn now to the right and now to the left. It is said that the village faces always the cool air of water, basically the cool air of Jolkor that bounds the village.

Government and public services

There is no hospital in Jhuruli. Residents depend on the Badartala Hospital in Basirhat. 

Any government schemes are being implemented by Gram Panchayet via either the Primary School or Angan Wadi School.

90% of farmers are not able to access government benefit schemes due to accessibility issues

Infrastructure
The sovereignty of society with political and social is deep-rooted here that graduated by government's infrastructure. The political and social organizations are abided of government's rule.

Census collective chart table

Transport

Transport is an important part of India's economy. Since the economic liberalization of the 1990s, development of infrastructure within the country, town and village have progressed at a rapid pace, and today there is a wide variety of modes of transport by land, water and air. But here in the small villages it is not changed as in the town has been. In Jhuruli the transport is about has developed gradually. There is bus transport, which was begun in 2008 with about 40 buses. The DN 38 bus route started from Taranipur to Malancha through Basirhat town, Champapukur, Kholapota. It stopped unexpectedly in 2013 due to the road's bad condition. Other transport systems include auto rickshaw, motorcycle, motor van, Maruti Suzuki, taxi, and bicycle.

The goods which are transported to various town and other part of India are: fish, crayfish, shrimp, whitefish, big guns, ready made fabric, textiles, garments (shirt, pants, gown, skirts, etc.)

Healthcare

Here is a Healthcare centre. It is not only for this village but also for nearby villagers. People from all side come here for disease-cure and any kind of physical treatment.

Culture
The culture here is basically rural as in other villages of India as opposed to western norms which the west colonial has imposed upon Indian population. People wear basically Dhuti, Lungi, Pajama, Shirt, trousers and speak in a very dialectic sort. They sometimes speak Hindi, but most of the time Bengali. English is frequently used.

Club
The only government registered club in 'Jhuruli' is Jhuruli Abahani Krira Chakra. The sports which play here take place under this club. The annual knock-out football match of 16 teams holds during winter season is the best annual match-cup with ticket system which everyone enjoy here.

Sports

Here sport means life of the village. Every year during October–November holds a knock-out football match of 16 teams organizes by Jhuruli Abahani Krira Chakra in the ball field that is the major point of this village. Apart from that, there are daily football match played in afternoon along with cricket and other sports played here.

References

External links

Villages in North 24 Parganas district